Gustave Adrian "Gus" Barnes (9 May 1877 – 14 March 1921) was an English violinist, painter and sculptor with a significant career in South Australia, notably as curator at the Art Gallery.

Biography
Barnes was born in Islington, Middlesex, the eldest son of John William Barnes (1854–1909), a builder and plasterer, and his wife Ann Eliza Barnes, née May (d. 1956). Around 1890 the family migrated to Adelaide, where his father and William Neate (1848–1932) set up in business in Flinders Street as Barnes & Neate, modellers and plasterers. They specialised in fibrous plaster and pressed cement, and their work is evident in the Steamship building, the Art Gallery and Savings Bank of South Australia, to name a few.

On leaving school, Barnes had some training in modelling from his father, and was a fine musician, having studied violin under A. C. Quin, leader of the Adelaide Grand Orchestra. He studied painting under James Ashton and was from 1896 a member of the Adelaide Easel Club. In 1900 Gustave travelled to Europe to continue his study of the violin, and painting under Professor Herkomer.

Barnes obtained employment at the Doulton pottery works as a designer, painter and modeller, and during his evenings studied at the Royal College of Art, South Kensington. In 1908, he exhibited a water-colour, "Suffolk Marshes", at the Royal Academy of Arts. He also played violin in Sir Edward Elgar's second orchestra. His father died in 1909 and Barnes returned to Adelaide to carry on his business.

Barnes did a great deal of landscape painting, much on rambles in the Adelaide Hills with Hans Heysen, and was very interested in black and white work. In 1915 he was appointed art supervisor at the Art Gallery of South Australia and served classifying and cataloguing prints and drawings until 1918, when he was appointed curator. He regularly exhibited rural landscapes with the South Australian Society of Arts. The gallery bought "Monarch of the Glen", "Morning in the Hills" and "Mount Barker from Crafers". He also played violin in Hermann Heinicke's ensemble.

Barnes took up painting at a relatively late age, and some of his work suggests that had he lived longer he might have reached a higher position in Australian art than is usually given him. Landscapes in oil were probably his forté, but he was also a designer, a modeller in clay and an etcher, and was equally successful in all these branches of art. In his modest way he exerted a quiet but powerful influence on the development of local art, as exemplified by his lectures on the subject. He was a musician of considerable skill and an enthusiast for great literature, and very well-informed on a wide range of subjects.

Barnes lived in the recently developed eastern Adelaide suburb of Kensington Gardens, in his later years before his early death on 14 March 1921.

Family
Barnes married Annie May while in England in 1909 and his wife and two children survived him.  In Adelaide, the family lived at West Terrace, Kensington Gardens.

Painter L. J. Barnes of Sydney, and Doris Barnes, eminent photographer of Adelaide, were his brother and sister.

Selected works

The Art Gallery of South Australia holds a number of his paintings:
Colonel Light's residence at Thebarton, S.A.
Frenchman's Rock, Kangaroo Island
Hans Heysen painting at King's Sound
Mount Barker from Crafers
The Monarch of the Glen
The Quarry
View of Adelaide from the Reed Beds
Morning in the Hills
and the State Library has an early watercolor:
Farm, Gilles Plains
He painted backdrops for various exhibits in the South Australian Museum.

Mount Barker Landscape is on display at the Carrick Hill mansion.

He built a large scale model illustrating the Gallipoli campaign which was displayed at the Library, and a relief map, which went to the Department of Defence's war museum.

He was commissioned by Prince Alfred College "old boys" to produce a bronze bust of their retired headmaster Frederic Chapple, which was presented to the school in 1918.

Sources
Nancy Benko, 'Barnes, Gustave Adrian (1877 - 1921)', Australian Dictionary of Biography, Volume 7, MUP, 1979, pp 179–180.

References

20th-century Australian painters
20th-century Australian male artists
20th-century Australian sculptors
Australian art curators
Australian violinists
Male violinists
1877 births
1921 deaths
Australian male painters
20th-century English painters
20th-century English male artists
English violinists
English male painters
British emigrants to Australia